"They're Made Out of Meat" is a short story by American writer Terry Bisson. It was originally published in OMNI. It consists entirely of dialogue between two characters. Bisson's website hosts a theatrical adaptation. A film adaptation won the Grand Prize at the Seattle Science Fiction Museum's 2006 film festival.

The story was collected in the 1993 anthology Bears Discover Fire and Other Stories, and has circulated widely on the Internet, which Bisson finds "flattering". It has been quoted in cognitive, cosmological, and philosophical scholarship.

Plot

The two characters are intelligent beings capable of traveling faster than light, on a mission to "contact, welcome and log in any and all sentient races or multibeings in this quadrant of the Universe." Bisson's stage directions represent them as "two lights moving like fireflies among the stars" on a projection screen. One of them tells the incredulous other about the recent discovery of carbon-based lifeforms "made up entirely of meat". After conversing briefly about it, they both deem such beings and communication with them too bizarre and agree to "erase the records and forget the whole thing", marking the Solar System "unoccupied".

Film adaptations

They're Made out of Meat (2005)
In 2005, Stephen O'Regan wrote and directed a live film adaptation starring Tom Noonan and Ben Bailey. The film was made as a final project for the New York Film Academy. The main action takes place inside of a diner on Staten Island, NY full of teenagers. The music for the film was scored by Bob Reynolds.

They're Made out of Meat (2010)
Jeff Frumess and Trevor Scott produced a version in 2010.  They added the character of a homeless conspiracy theorist with an original score by musician Sam Belkin. The film was shot at the Hartsdale train platform on the Metro North in Westchester, NY.

See also 
 Carbon chauvinism
 Zoo hypothesis
 Fables for Robots – a collection of short stories where humans and other organic life are looked upon similarly

References

External links
 - the text of the short story
"They're Made Out of Meat" - Terry Bisson's text copy
A directory of 10+ short film adaptations from 2006 on
2012 production as a radio play (WNYC)

1991 short stories
Artificial intelligence in fiction
Brain–computer interfacing in fiction
Science fiction comedy
Fiction portraying humans as aliens
Short stories adapted into films
Short stories by Terry Bisson
Science fiction theatre
Works originally published in Omni (magazine)